Edward Harley, 2nd Earl of Oxford and Earl Mortimer (2 June 1689 – 16 June 1741), styled Lord Harley between 1711 and 1724, was a British politician, bibliophile, collector and patron of the arts.

Background
Harley was the only son of Robert Harley, 1st Earl of Oxford and Earl Mortimer, by his first wife, Elizabeth Foley.

Career
He was MP for Radnor (as his father and paternal grandfather had been before him) from 1711 to 1714, and for Cambridgeshire from 1722 until he succeeded his father in 1724 and entered the House of Lords. He was a bibliophile, collector and patron of the arts, and took little interest in public affairs. Harley's considerable collection of coins and medals – 520 lots in all – was auctioned by Christopher Cock at his house in the Great Piazza, Covent Garden over six days, from 18 March 1742.

He extended his father's library and expanded the Harleian Collection, now in the British Library. The department of Manuscripts and Special Collections, The University of Nottingham holds a number of papers relating to the 2nd Earl and the management of his estates in the Portland (London) collection. Harley family papers (Pw2Hy) are part of the Portland (Welbeck) Collection.

London estate
Through his wife, he inherited Welbeck Abbey in Nottinghamshire, and Wimpole Hall in Cambridgeshire. Wimpole became their main residence, but they had to sell it in 1740 to pay Edward's debts. He also acquired a considerable amount of land in the West End of London which was developed during his life. Many of the now famous streets took their names from Harley connections – primarily Harley Street and Oxford Street. Other streets, named after Harley properties, include Wigmore Street and Wimpole Street.

Family
On 31 August 1713 he married Lady Henrietta Cavendish Holles (1694–1755), only daughter and heir of the 1st Duke of Newcastle and his wife, the former Lady Margaret Cavendish, daughter of the 2nd Duke of Newcastle-upon-Tyne. They had two children:

Lady Margaret Cavendish Harley (1715–1785), who married William Bentinck, 2nd Duke of Portland in 1734.
Henry Cavendish Harley, Lord Harley (18 October 1725 – 22 October 1725)

Lord Oxford and Mortimer died in London in 1741 and was buried in the vault of the Duke of Newcastle in Westminster Abbey. He was succeeded in the earldom by his cousin Edward Harley, 3rd Earl of Oxford and Earl Mortimer.

References 
David Stoker, 'Harley, Edward, second earl of Oxford and Mortimer (1689–1741)’, Oxford Dictionary of National Biography, Oxford University Press, 2004; online edn, May 2005

External links 
Biographies of the Dukes of Portland and associated families, with links to online catalogues, from Manuscripts and Special Collections, The University of Nottingham
Edward Harley at thePeerage.com

1689 births
1741 deaths
Earls in the Peerage of Great Britain
Members of the Parliament of Great Britain for English constituencies
Harleian Collection
Members of the Parliament of Great Britain for Welsh constituencies
British MPs 1710–1713
British MPs 1713–1715
British MPs 1722–1727
Fellows of the Royal Society
Edward
English book and manuscript collectors